Senator McMullen may refer to:

Adam McMullen (1872–1959), Nebraska State Senate
Fayette McMullen (1805–1880), Virginia State Senate
John McMullen (politician) (1843–1922), Wisconsin State Senate

See also
Harry McMullan, North Carolina State Senate
Dix H. McMullin (1933–2008), Utah State Senate
Senator McMillan (disambiguation)